Sepahua Airport  is an airport serving the village of Sepahua (es) in the Ucayali Region of Peru.

The airport is at the confluence of the Sepahua River into the Urubamba River.

See also

Transport in Peru
List of airports in Peru

References

External links
OpenStreetMap - Sepahua
OurAirports - Sepahua
SkyVector - Sepahua
Sepahua Airport

Airports in Peru
Buildings and structures in Ucayali Region